Marian Brooke Rogers  is a British psychologist who is a Professor of Behavioural Science and Security at King's College London where she is Deputy Head of the Department of War Studies. She is a social psychologist who studies risk and threat. In 2014 she was asked to chair the Cabinet Office Behavioural Science Expert Group (BSEG). In 2019 she was appointed Chair of the Home Office Science Advisory Council (HOSAC).  Professor Rogers was appointed to the Prime Minister's Council for Science and Technology in 2020.

Early life and education 
Rogers trained in social psychology and specialised in the study of social groups. She obtained her PhD degree from Royal Holloway, University of London in 2003. After earning her doctorate, Rogers joined King's College London as a research fellow in the King's Centre for Risk Management. Her early work explored the formation of attitudes and beliefs, and the impact of attitudes and beliefs on behaviour and mental health. Her interest in the interactions between attitudes, beliefs, and behaviour led her to explore risk perception and risk communication across a variety of contexts.  Some of her earliest investigations into chemical, biological, radiological, and nuclear (CBRN) events looked to support hospitals in their planning for radiological warfare.

Research and career 
Her research considers threat and the communication of risk. She develops strategies and training to make society safer, and works with governments and industry to implement novel communication strategies. She has studied how emergency organisations can more effectively communicate during crises. She was made chair of the Cabinet Office's National Risk Assessment and National Security Risk Assessment Behavioural Science Expert Group (BSEG) in 2014. The National Risk Register collates evidence that discusses natural disasters and high impact events.  Rogers believes to mitigate radicalisation, young people should be trained in critical thinking and that better relationships need to be built between people and their communities. Rogers's work has contributed to the evidence-base that has shifted the popular practitioner belief that the public were likely to panic when facing disaster towards a more nuanced view incorporating a range of behavioural responses to extreme events. Most importantly, there is a growing recognition that under-response can be just as dangerous as over-response. She has since worked with the OECD, NATO Defense Against Terrorism and the International Atomic Energy Agency.

She was made an Officer of the Order of the British Empire (OBE) in the 2018 New Year Honours. Rogers was appointed Chair of the Home Office Science Advisory Council in 2019. In this capacity she advises the Home Office on policy related to science and engineering. During the COVID-19 pandemic Rogers highlighted the importance of Government of the United Kingdom adopting an evidence-based approach to high-impact risks such as pandemics. This holds true for the UK National Risk Register, which she has helped to inform and assess every two years. The UK National Risk Register illustrates that of all potential risks, an influenza pandemic has the potential to have the most severe impact, and the highest likelihood of occurring in the next five years. Rogers argues that The Civil Contingencies Act 2004 set out roles and a range of duties for organisations to establish and test plans for preparing for pandemic response.  In spite of this forward planning, pandemic response will pose a significant challenge.

She is one of the 23 attendees of the Scientific Advisory Group for Emergencies (Sage), advising the United Kingdom government on the COVID-19 pandemic.

Selected publications

References 

Living people
Year of birth missing (living people)
British women psychologists
Social psychologists
Academics of King's College London
Alumni of Royal Holloway, University of London
Members of the Order of the British Empire